Johann Peter Gogarten is a German-American biologist studying the early evolution of life. Born in Bad Oeynhausen, Germany, he studied plant physiology and membrane transport with Friedrich-Wilhelm Bentrup in Tübingen and Giessen. In 1987 he moved to the US as a postdoc to work with Lincoln Taiz at UC Santa Cruz. He currently is Distinguished Professor of Molecular and Cell Biology at the University of Connecticut in Storrs, CT.

Gogarten rooted the tree of life using an ancient gene duplication. He was also one of the pioneers to recognize the importance and the extent of horizontal gene transfer and its role in microbial evolution.

One of Gogarten’s current focuses in his research is the evolution of homing endonuclease utilizing parasitic genetic elements (inteins) and the intertwining of selection occurring on the gene, population and the community level (multilevel selection, Unit of selection).

J. Peter Gogarten was selected as a recipient of a 2009 Fulbright scholarship, a member of the CT Academy of Science and Engineering, and fellow of the American Academy of Microbiology and of the International Society for the Study of the Origin of Life.

References

External links 
Gogarten Lab › University of Connecticut
J. Peter Gogarten

Living people
Year of birth missing (living people)
German emigrants to the United States
University of California, Santa Cruz alumni
University of Connecticut faculty
21st-century German biologists
Fulbright alumni